The 1995 Sybase Open is a men's tennis tournament held in San Jose, California, United States and played on indoor hard courts. The event was part of the ATP World Series of the 1995 ATP Tour. It was the 107th edition of the tournament and was held from February 6 through February 13, 1995.

First-seeded Andre Agassi won the singles title, his third win in San Jose after 1990 and 1993.

Finals

Singles

 Andre Agassi defeated  Michael Chang, 6–2, 1–6, 6–3
 It was Agassi's 2nd singles title of the year and the 26th of his career.

Doubles

 Jim Grabb /  Patrick McEnroe defeated  Alex O'Brien /  Sandon Stolle, 3–6, 7–5, 6–0

References

External links
 ITF tournament edition details

Sybase Open
SAP Open
1995 in American tennis
Sybase Open
Sybase Open